Bigagli is a surname. Notable people with the surname include:

Alberta Bigagli (1928–2017), Italian psychologist and poet
Claudio Bigagli (born 1955), Italian actor

Italian-language surnames